Li Song-suk is a female former North Korean international table tennis player.

Table tennis career
She won a silver medal in the women's singles and a bronze medal in the women's doubles with Ro Jong-suk at the 1979 World Table Tennis Championships.

She also won four team medals from 1977 to 1983.

See also
 List of table tennis players
 List of World Table Tennis Championships medalists

References

North Korean female table tennis players
Asian Games medalists in table tennis
Table tennis players at the 1982 Asian Games
Asian Games bronze medalists for North Korea
Medalists at the 1982 Asian Games
World Table Tennis Championships medalists